Geneva is a city in and the county seat of Geneva County, Alabama, United States. It was incorporated in 1875. It is part of the Dothan, Alabama Metropolitan Statistical Area. Since 1940, it has been the largest city of Geneva County, and had a population of 4,292 as of the 2020 census.

Newspaper

 Geneva County Reaper

History 
In late December 1862, the stern-wheel steamship Bloomer was in port on the Choctawhatchee River in Geneva. She was captured by a group of Union troops from the 91st New York Volunteers led by Lieutenant James H. Stewart. The Bloomer was then taken to Pensacola, Florida.

On March 10, 2009, in the Alabama towns of Kinston, Samson and Geneva, Michael McLendon went on a shooting rampage, killing ten people and wounding six more before committing suicide.

Geography
Geneva is located south of the center of Geneva County at  (31.038181, -85.876677), at the confluence of the Pea River with the Choctawhatchee River. Alabama State Route 52 passes through the city north of downtown, leading northeast  to Hartford and northwest  to Samson. Alabama State Route 27 passes through the center of Geneva, leading north  to Enterprise and southwest  to the Florida border.

The Choctawhatchee River forms the eastern border of the city, flowing south to Choctawhatchee Bay in Florida, which enters the Gulf of Mexico at Destin.

Demographics

2000 census
At the 2000 census there were 4,388 people, 1,801 households, and 1,197 families living in the city. The racial makeup of the city was 84.12% White, 14.18% Black or African American, 0.32% Native American, 0.05% Asian, 0.02% Pacific Islander, 0.46% from other races, and 0.87% from two or more races. 1.09% of the population were Hispanic or Latino of any race.
Of the 1,801 households 29.9% had children under the age of 18 living with them, 48.7% were married couples living together, 14.2% had a female householder with no husband present, and 33.5% were non-families. 31.4% of households were one person and 15.2% were one person aged 65 or older. The average household size was 2.35 and the average family size was 2.94.

The age distribution was 24.0% under the age of 18, 8.0% from 18 to 24, 24.3% from 25 to 44, 25.0% from 45 to 64, and 18.6% 65 or older. The median age was 40 years. For every 100 females, there were 89.4 males. For every 100 females age 18 and over, there were 82.3 males.

2010 census
At the 2010 census there were 4,452 people, 1,826 households, and 1,204 families living in the city. There were 2,090 housing units at an average density of 141 per square mile (54/km). The racial makeup of the city was 83.2% White, 14.0% Black or African American, 0.4% Native American, 0.4% Asian, 0.0% Pacific Islander, 0.5% from other races, and 1.5% from two or more races. 1.8% of the population were Hispanic or Latino of any race.
Of the 1,826 households 23.4% had children under the age of 18 living with them, 45.2% were married couples living together, 15.6% had a female householder with no husband present, and 34.1% were non-families. 31.5% of households were one person and 15.5% were one person aged 65 or older. The average household size was 2.36 and the average family size was 2.94.

The age distribution was 21.4% under the age of 18, 8.0% from 18 to 24, 22.1% from 25 to 44, 28.1% from 45 to 64, and 20.3 who were 65 or older. The median age was 43.6 years. For every 100 females, there were 90.7 males. For every 100 females age 18 and over, there were 96.1 males.

2020 census

As of the 2020 United States census, there were 4,245 people, 1,800 households, and 1,007 families residing in the city.

Landscape 

Geneva is settled on the junction of the Choctawhatchee River and Pea River. The Choctawhatchee River runs all the way to the Choctawhatchee Bay at Freeport, Florida, which flows into the Gulf of Mexico. Because of this, Geneva was a busy trading center for steam-powered riverboats in the late 19th and early 20th centuries.

Culture 
Every year in April, Geneva holds a River Festival, which brings in hundreds of people from all over the country to the small town. The River Festival is held on the junction of the two rivers, at Robert Fowler Park, and has many competitive events, such as a  road race, greasy pole climb, canoe race, and tug-of-war.

Education 
Geneva has the James A. Mulkey Elementary School, Geneva Middle School, and Geneva High School located within its city limits.

Notable people
Elizabeth B. Andrews, former U.S. Representative, wife of congressman George William Andrews, and the first woman to represent Alabama in the United States House of Representatives
Siran Stacy, former NFL running back

Climate
The climate in this area is characterized by hot, humid summers and generally mild to cool winters. According to the Köppen Climate Classification system, Geneva has a humid subtropical climate, abbreviated "Cfa" on climate maps.

References

External links
City of Geneva official website
Official Records of the Union and Confederate Navies in the War of the Rebellion

Cities in Alabama
Cities in Geneva County, Alabama
County seats in Alabama
Dothan metropolitan area, Alabama